Spišské Hanušovce is a village and municipality in Kežmarok District in the Prešov Region of north Slovakia.

Geography
The municipality lies at an altitude of 614 metres and covers an area of 14.296 km² . It has a population of about 780 (2016) people.

History
In historical records the village was first mentioned in 1313. The name had been Hannesdorf. Locals had been engaged in forestry and sawmilling.

Economy and infrastructure
The proximity of Pieniny and High Tatras touristic areas have developed tourism in the village. There are several ski slopes nearby. In the village, there is an ice hockey club.

References

External links
http://www.spisskehanusovce.sk
http://www.pieninyportal.com/index.php/sk/spisske-hanusovce.page

Villages and municipalities in Kežmarok District